Umling La or Umlung La is a mountain pass in Ladakh, India on the ridgeline between Koyul Lungpa and the Indus River near Demchok.

The Unling La pass is traversed by a road between Chisumle and Demchok, also called the Umling La Road, which ascends to a great height of 5,798.251 m (19,024 ft 0.73 in) in the vicinity of the pass, making it the world's highest motorable road.

Chisumle-Demchok road 
In 2017 a road was constructed between Chisumle and Demchok villages passing through Umling La. The road was completed by the Border Roads Organization of India, making it the world's highest motorable road and pass. The pass is located at kilometer 24, part of the  Chisumle-Demchok road.

World Records 
Umling La pass holds the record for the World Highest Motorable road  as well as was used to set the record for the Highest Auto Rickshaw in the World (set by two teams jointly, from Switzerland and Canada)

See also

 Demchok sector
 Indo-China Border Roads
 List of mountain passes of India

References

Geography of Ladakh
Mountain passes of Ladakh